Azar Lawrence (born November 3, 1952) is an American jazz saxophonist, known for his contributions as sideman to McCoy Tyner, Miles Davis, Freddie Hubbard, and Woody Shaw.

Career
Lawrence released Summer Solstice on Prestige Records in 1975, produced by Orrin Keepnews.  It  featured Raul de Souza, Gerald Hayes, Amaury Tristão, Dom Salvador, Ron Carter, Guilherme Franco on the songs "Novo Ano" and "Highway" which were composed by Amaury Tristão, and Lawrence, Souza, Albert Dailey, Carter and Billy Hart on all other selections.

Bridge Into The New Age featured Jean Carn, Woody Shaw, Ray Straughter, Woody Murray, Clint Houston, Billy Hart, Guillerme Franco, Julian Priester, Hadley Caliman, Black Arthur, Joe Bonner, John Heard, Leon "Ndugu" Chancler, Mtume and Kenneth Nash.

People Moving featured Patrice Rushen, Jerry Peters, Michael Stanton, John Rowin, Lee Ritenour, Paul Jackson, Jr., Harvey Mason, Ernest Straughter.

Musician and screenwriter Herbert Baker taught music and mentored Lawrence, who recalled Baker as "one of the greatest pianists who ever lived."

Discography

As leader
 1974: Bridge into the New Age (Prestige)
 1975: Summer Solstice (Prestige)
 1976: People Moving  (Prestige)
 2007  Legacy & Music Of John Coltrane (Clarion Jazz) - with Edwin Bayard							  
 2008  Speak The Word (Zarman Productions) - with Nate Morgan
 2009: Prayer For My Ancestors (Furthermore)
 2010: Mystic Journey (Furthermore)
 2014: The Seeker (Sunnyside)
 2015: Conduit (Intofocus) - with Al McLean
 2016: Frontiers (Cellar Live) - with Al McLean
 2018: Elementals (HighNote)

As sideman
With Mulatu Astatke
Timeless (2010, Mochilla)With Henry ButlerFivin' Around (1986, Impulse!/MCA)With Miles DavisDark Magus (1977, Columbia, recorded 1974)With Henry Franklin'If We Should Meet Again (2007, Skipper Productions)O, What A Beautiful Morning! (2008, Skipper Productions)Home Cookin (2009, Skipper Productions) With Gene HarrisIn a Special Way (1976, Blue Note)With Freddie HubbardBundle of Joy (1977, Columbia)With Elvin JonesNew Agenda (1975, Vanguard) With Franklin Kiermyer Further (2014, Mobility Music)With Woody ShawThe Moontrane (1974, Muse)With The 360 Degree Music ExperienceIn: Sanity (1976, Black Saint)With McCoy TynerEnlightenment (1973, Milestone)
Sama Layuca (1974, Milestone)
Atlantis (1974, Milestone)With Harry WhitakerBlack Renaissance (1976, Bay State/Ubiquity)With Eden Atwood'Like Someone in Love'' (2010, Sinatra Society of Japan)

References

External links

Azar Lawrence video interview at allaboutjazz.com

1952 births
Living people
American jazz saxophonists
American male saxophonists
Musicians from California
Prestige Records artists
21st-century American saxophonists
American male jazz musicians
21st-century American male musicians
HighNote Records artists
Sunnyside Records artists